Noel Kingsbury is a British garden designer and writer on gardening, plant sciences and related topics. He is best known for his promotion of naturalistic planting design in gardens and designed landscapes (e.g. the 1996 publication of 'The New Perennial Garden', pub. Frances Lincoln, London),  and his collaboration with Dutch garden and landscape designer Piet Oudolf on books on planting design. He writes occasionally for The Daily Telegraph, Gardens Illustrated magazine and The Garden - the membership magazine of the Royal Horticultural Society. He has worked with Prof. Nigel Dunnett, of the University of Sheffield on the first book in English on green roof and related 'green architecture' technologies.
In collaboration with Tim Richardson Kingsbury has edited Vista, the Culture and Politics of Gardens and co-chairs events at the Garden Museum in London under the title 'Vista'. He has worked with several notable garden photographers, such as Marianne Majerus and Andrea Jones.

Kingsbury earned a doctorate from the University of Sheffield in 2009, for a thesis on the Long term performance of ornamental herbaceous vegetation. He continues to research in this area.

Kingsbury has also written a history of plant breeding, Hybrid, The History and Science of Plant Breeding (2009).

Books

References

External links
 
 
 Planting: A New Perspective, with Piet Oudolf (2013)

British gardeners
British garden writers
Living people
20th-century British writers
21st-century British writers
Alumni of the University of Sheffield
20th-century British male writers
Year of birth missing (living people)